The 2022 City of London Corporation election took place on 24 March 2022 to elect members of the Court of Common Council in the City of London Corporation, England. The election was postponed for a year due to the COVID-19 pandemic.

Background 
Elections to the Court of Common Council, the main decision-making body of the City of London Corporation which governs the City of London, take place every four years. In the previous election in 2017, 95 seats were won by independent candidates and the remaining five by the Labour Party.

The election was originally scheduled for 18 March 2021, but was delayed for a year due to the COVID-19 pandemic.

It had been proposed that, due to the pandemic, the elections be combined with the 2021 United Kingdom local elections in the rest of England on 6 May. The City's Policy and Resources Committee recommended against this, and suggested July 2021 as an alternative date should the elections need to be postponed.

Electoral system 
Most residents of the twenty-five wards of the City of London live in the Aldersgate, Cripplegate, Portsoken and Queenhithe. Residents have one vote each, and businesses have a number of votes that scales with the number of employees. Businesses can appoint one employee as a voter for every five staff up to ten voters, with an additional voter per fifty staff beyond that.

Councillors are elected by multi-member first-past-the-post.

Campaign 
The Russian state-owned VTB Bank, which had been sanctioned by the UK government over the 2022 Russian invasion of Ukraine, nonetheless received a share of votes.

Overall results 
The election resulted in Temple and Farringdon Together and the Labour Party winning the same number of seats as they had done in the previous election, with Temple and Farringdon Together on ten seats and Labour on five. The new Castle Baynard Independents won seven seats, with the remaining seats being won by independent candidates. The Women's Equality Party stood candidates but none were successful. One of the victorious independent candidates was Emily Benn, whose grandfather was the Labour MP Tony Benn.

Ward results 

Statements of persons nominated were published on 1 March. Incumbent councillors are marked with an asterisk (*).

Aldersgate

Aldgate 

Andrien Meyers, Tim McNally, David Sales, Mandeep Thandi and Shailendra Umradia stood together under the name "Aldgate Team".

Bassishaw

Billingsgate 

Nighat Qureishi and Luis Tilleria stood together under the slogan "Build a Better Billingsgate".

Bishopsgate

Bread Street 

Emily Benn stood jointly with Giles Shilson.

Bridge

Broad Street 

Shahnan Bakth, Christopher Hayward and Antony Manchester stood jointly.

Candlewick 

The incumbent councillors James de Sausmarez and Kevin Everett stood jointly; the other candidates, Christopher Boden and James Bromiley-Davis likewise stood as a pair.

Castle Baynard 

Candidates for the Castle Baynard Independents Party are marked CB Independents. Change in voteshare for CB Independents candidates reflect their previous voteshare when running as independents.

Cheap

Coleman Street

Cordwainer 

The three candidates, elected unopposed, stood jointly.

Cornhill

Cripplegate 

Simon Walsh and Ceri Wilkins stood together jointly.

Dowgate 

The incumbent councillors Henry Pollard and Mark Wheatley stood jointly.

Farringdon Within

Farringdon Without 

The ten incumbents stood for the Temple and Farringdon Together party, the label they had been elected as in the 2017 election.

Langbourn 

Alexander Craggs, Judith Pleasance and Philip Woodhouse stood together jointly.

Lime Street

Portsoken 

The election that took place in Portsoken Ward recorded the highest turnout in the entire 2022 Common Council Elections with 57.6% of the electorate casting their vote. The average turnout across the City of London was 36.5%. Two incumbent councillors, Munsur Ali and Jason Paul Pritchard, who were elected as Labour candidates in 2017, stood jointly. John Fletcher and Henry Jones stood jointly. Changes in voteshare are by party for the Labour candidates and by candidate for independent candidates who previously stood as independents.

Queenhithe

Tower 

Roger Chadwick, Marianne Fredericks, James Tumbridge and Jason Groves stood jointly as the "Tower Ward Team".

Vintry 

Rehana Ameer and Richard Burge stood jointly.

Walbrook 

The incumbent councillors, Peter Bennett and James Thomson, stood jointly.

References

City of London Corporation elections
City of London